The Bell HSL (Model 61) was an American 1950s anti-submarine warfare (ASW) helicopter built by the Bell Helicopter company, the only tandem rotor type designed by Bell.

Design and development

The prototype Bell Model 61 first flew on 3 March 1953; it had been designed to meet a United States Navy requirement for an anti-submarine warfare helicopter. In June 1950, the Model 61 was announced as the winner of the competition, and three XHSL-1 evaluation aircraft were ordered. The Model 61 had a rectangular-section fuselage structure and  four-leg, six-wheel landing gear. It was powered by a Pratt & Whitney R-2800 radial engine mounted in the aft fuselage. Crew included two pilots and two sonar operators.

Because of the urgency of the requirement, low-rate production was ordered almost immediately after Bell received a contract for three XHSL-1s. The Navy eventually contracted for at least 160 production aircraft, including 18 intended for the British Royal Navy. Bureau Numbers were assigned for a total of 234. Because of development problems that resulted in poor schedule performance to the contract, only 50 were built. Although all were delivered, after service test and acceptance only a handful were used, for the development of airborne mine sweeping. The rest were delivered directly into storage and were subsequently struck off.

Operational history
The HSLs were not used operationally. Approximately seven were assigned to the U.S. Naval Air Mine Defense Unit at Panama City, Florida, for the development of airborne mine-sweeping, the first arriving in September 1956 and the last being struck off in early 1960.

Variants
XHSL-1
two experimental flight test and one static test article
HSL-1
production version, 50 built.
Bell Model 61
Company designation for the HSL
Bell D-116
 A proposed civil variant of the Model 61, not proceeded with.
Bell D-216
 A proposed variant of the HSL, not proceeded with.
Bell D-238
 A proposed variant of the HSL, not proceeded with.

Operators

United States Navy

Specifications (HSL-1)

See also

References
Notes

Bibliography

 Andrade, John M. U.S.Military Aircraft Designation and Serials since 1909. Leicester, UK: Midland Counties Publications, 1979. .
 The Illustrated Encyclopedia of Aircraft (Part Work 1982–1985). London, Orbis Publishing, 1985.
 Thomason, Tommy H. The Forgotten Bell HSL. Simi Valley, CA: Ginter Books, 2005.

External links

 helis.com: Helicopter history site

1950s United States anti-submarine aircraft
Tandem rotor helicopters
1950s United States helicopters
Single-engined piston helicopters
Aircraft first flown in 1953
HSL